SV Horn is an Austrian association football club playing in the city of Horn.

The club plays in the Austrian Second League. The team was champion of the Landesliga Niederösterreich in 1991, 1998 and 2007. In 2008, SV Horn won the Austrian Cup by beating SV Feldkirchen in the final. The club lost the unofficial Austrian Supercup match 2008 against SK Rapid Wien 1–7.

On 8 June 2015, Keisuke Honda's management company, "Honda ESTILO" owned by his two brothers Hiroyuki and Youji, bought 49% of the shares in the club.

Honours 
Austrian Cup
Winners: 2007–08

Current squad

Out on loan

Managerial history

From 1990 onwards

  Anton Dragúň (1990–1994)
  Karl Daxbacher (1994–1995)
  Peter Leitl (1995)
  Andreas Singer (1995–1999)
  Willhelm Schuldes (1999–2003)
  Reinhard Schendlinger (2003–2004)
  Bohumil Smrček (2004)
  Attila Sekerlioglu (2005)
  Rupert Marko (2005–2010)
  Michael Streiter (2010–2013)
  Willhelm Schuldes (2013–2014)
  Christoph Westerthaler (2014–2015) 
  Hans Kleer (2015–2016)
  Christoph Westerthaler (2016)
  Hamayoshi Masanori (2016–2017)
  Carsten Jancker (2017–2018)
  Hamayoshi Masanori (2017–2019)
  Hans Kleer (2019–2020)
  Aleksandr Borodyuk (2020–)

References

External links 
  

 
Football clubs in Austria
Association football clubs established in 1922
1922 establishments in Austria
Horn District